Tulsa, the second largest city in the U.S. state of Oklahoma, is the site of 26 completed high-rises over , 4 of which stand taller than . The tallest building in the city is the BOK Tower, which rises  in Downtown Tulsa and was completed in 1975. It also stands as the 2nd-tallest building in Oklahoma. The second-tallest skyscraper in the city is the Cityplex Central Tower, which rises  and was completed in 1979. The First Place Tower, completed in 1975 and rising , is the third-tallest building in Tulsa. Five of the ten tallest buildings in Oklahoma are located in Tulsa.

The history of skyscrapers in the city began with the construction of Cosden Building in 1918. This building, rising 16 floors, is often regarded as the first skyscraper in Tulsa. As of November 1, 2019, no buildings are under construction or are planned to rise at least .



Tallest buildings
This height includes spires and architectural details but does not include antenna masts.

Timeline of tallest buildings

Since 1918, the year the first high-rise in the city was constructed, the title of the tallest building in Tulsa has been held by six high-rises.

See also
 List of tallest buildings in Oklahoma / the United States / the world
 List of tallest buildings in Oklahoma City
 List of Art Deco buildings in Tulsa
 Buildings of Tulsa

Notes

References
General

Specific

External links
 Tulsa Skyscraper Diagram on SkyscraperPage

 List of tallest
Tallest
Tulsa